Kambhampadu is a village in Palnadu district of the Indian state of Andhra Pradesh. It is located in Macherla mandal of Gurazala revenue division.

Geography 

Demographics 
Kambhampadu has a population of 8,681 of which 4,434 are male and 4,247 are female, as per the Population Census of 2011. In 2011, the literacy rate of Kambhampadu village was 54.90%, compared to 67.02% in the rest of the state. The male rate in Kambhampadu is 67.82% while the female rate is 41.61%.

Governance 

Kambhampadu gram panchayat is the local self-government of the village. It is divided into wards and each ward is represented by a ward member.

Education 

As per the school information report for the academic year 2018–19, the village has a total of 3 Zilla Parishad/MPP schools.

References

External links 
 STUDY OF KAMBHAMPADU VILLAGE, MACHERLA MANDAL, GUNTUR DISTRICT, A.P

Villages in Palnadu district